Third-seeded Ashley Cooper defeated Mal Anderson 7–5, 6–3, 6–4 in the final to win the men's singles tennis title at the 1958 Australian Championships.

Seeds
The seeded players are listed below. Ashley Cooper is the champion; others show the round in which they were eliminated.

  Mal Anderson (finalist)
  Barry MacKay (second round)
  Ashley Cooper (champion)
  Ron Holmberg (first round)
  Neale Fraser (semifinals)
  Michael Green (quarterfinals)
  Mervyn Rose (semifinals)
  Trevor Fancutt (quarterfinals)
  Roy Emerson (quarterfinals)
  Bob Howe (quarterfinals)
  Rod Laver (second round)
  Bob Mark (second round)

Draw

Key
 Q = Qualifier
 WC = Wild card
 LL = Lucky loser
 r = Retired

Finals

Earlier rounds

Section 1

Section 2

External links
 

1958
1958 in Australian tennis